Faujasiopsis is a genus of flowering plants in the sunflower family, endemic to the Island of Mauritius in the Indian Ocean.

 Species
 Faujasiopsis boivinii - Mauritius
 Faujasiopsis flexuosa - Mauritius
 Faujasiopsis reticulata - Mauritius

References

 Mabberley, D.J.(1997):The Plant-Book, 2nd Ed., Cambridge University Press, UK 

 
Asteraceae genera
Endemic flora of Mauritius
Taxonomy articles created by Polbot